Male pregnancy is the incubation of one or more embryos or fetuses by organisms of the male sex in some species. Most species that reproduce by sexual reproduction are heterogamous—females producing larger gametes (ova) and males producing smaller gametes (sperm). In nearly all animal species, offspring are carried by the female until birth, but in fish of the family Syngnathidae (pipefish, seahorses and the leafy seadragon), males perform that function.

In animals

The fish family Syngnathidae has the unique characteristic of a highly derived form of male brood care referred to as "male pregnancy". The family is highly diverse, containing around 300 different species of fish. Included in Syngnathidae are seahorses, the pipefish, and the weedy and leafy seadragons. The males of some of these species possess a brood pouch on the trunk or tail; in other species, the eggs are merely attached to the male's trunk or tail when the female lays them. Although biologists' definitions of pregnancy somewhat differ, all members of the family are considered by ichthyologists to display male pregnancy, even those without an external brood pouch.

Fertilization may take place in the pouch or in the water before implantation, but in either case, syngnathids' male pregnancy ensures them complete confidence of paternity. After implantation in or on the brood pouch or brood patch, the male incubates the eggs. Many species osmoregulate the brood pouch fluid to maintain proper pH for the developing embryos. In at least some species, the male also provisions his offspring with nutrients such as glucose and amino acids through the highly vascularized attachment sites in or on his body.

This period of incubation can take much longer than the production of another clutch of eggs by the female, especially in temperate regions where pregnancies last longer, leading to a reproductive environment in which sexual selection can be stronger on females than on males due to increased male parental investment. This reversal of traditional sex roles has only been found in pipefishes, whereas seahorses have largely been accepted as monogamous. Some pipefish species display classical polyandry because of this unique situation. Male syngnathids usually prefer females with large body size and prominent ornaments such as blue skin pigmentation or skin folds. Syngnathid males in some species are apparently capable of absorbing eggs or embryos while in the brood pouch. In these cases, embryos with the highest survival rate are those whose mothers display the preferred phenotype.

Syngnathidae is the only family in the animal kingdom to which the term "male pregnancy" has been applied.

In 2021, Chinese researchers at the Naval Medical University in Shanghai published a preprint of a study that attempted to impregnate male rats by stitching them together with female rats. The study went viral on social media platform Weibo and attracted controversy over bioethics issues.

In humans

Ectopic implant
Mammalian males, including humans, do not possess a uterus to gestate offspring. The theoretical issue of male ectopic pregnancy (pregnancy outside the uterine cavity) by surgical implantation has been addressed by experts in the field of fertility medicine, who stress that the concept of ectopic implantation, while theoretically plausible, has never been attempted and would be difficult to justify – even for a woman lacking a uterus – owing to the extreme health risks to both the parent and child.

Robert Winston, a pioneer of in-vitro fertilization, told London's Sunday Times that "male pregnancy would certainly be possible" by having an embryo implanted in a man's abdomen – with the placenta attached to an internal organ such as the bowel – and later delivered surgically. Ectopic implantation of the embryo along the abdominal wall, and resulting placenta growth would, however, be very dangerous and potentially fatal for the host, and is therefore unlikely to be studied in humans. Gillian Lockwood, medical director of Midland Fertility Services, a British fertility clinic, noted that the abdomen has not evolved to separate from the placenta during delivery, hence the danger of an ectopic pregnancy. Bioethicist Glenn McGee said "the question is not 'Can a man do it?'. It's 'If a man does have a successful [ectopic] pregnancy, can he survive it?

Since 2000, several hoax web sites have appeared on the Internet purporting to describe the world's first pregnant man. While some rely on legitimate scientific claims, no such experiment has ever been reported. Fertility clinician Cecil Jacobson claimed to have transplanted a fertilized egg from a female baboon to the omentum in the abdominal cavity of a male baboon in the mid-1960s, which then carried the fetus for four months; however, Jacobson did not publish his claims in a scientific journal, and was subsequently convicted on several unrelated counts of fraud for ethical misconduct.

Uterus transplantation

Transplanting a uterus into a male body poses a challenge due to the lack of natural ligaments, vasculature, and hormones required to support the uterus. The uterus would either have to be donated by a willing donor or be tissue-engineered using the male's stem cells and then implanted into the pelvic region. Afterward, an in vitro fertilisation (IVF) procedure would be followed to insert the embryo into the male's transplanted womb. Due to the risks posed by long term anti-rejection medication, the uterus would need to be removed following the implied pregnancy. Given that humans do not require a uterus to survive, and knowing the predictable complications associated with uterus transplants in females, let alone males, many surgeons advise against the procedure altogether for healthy individuals. Lili Elbe was the first recipient of a uterus transplant in attempt to achieve pregnancy but later died of complications following the procedure.

In popular culture

Books 
Some science fiction writers have picked up on these issues, in "cross-gender" themes—e.g., Octavia E. Butler's Bloodchild and Other Stories.

Ursula K. Le Guin's novel The Left Hand of Darkness contains the sentence "The king was pregnant", and explores a society in which pregnancy can be experienced by anyone, since individuals are not sexually differentiated during most of their life and can become capable of inseminating or gestating at different times.

Lois McMaster Bujold's Ethan of Athos features an all-male society in which men use artificial wombs, but experience many of the psychological effects of pregnancy (anticipation, anxiety, etc.).

In Marge Piercy's feminist utopian novel Woman on the Edge of Time, neither men nor women get pregnant, leaving that to artificial wombs, but both sexes may lactate and nurse the infant; the specifically female experiences of pregnancy and nursing were opened to men in the cause of gender equality.

Larry Niven's 1969 essay "Man of Steel, Woman of Kleenex" ends with considering Superman as a carrier for his own baby, due to the difficulties a human female might encounter carrying a superpowered fetus. In A True Story by Lucian of Samosate, there are no women on the moon, and as such boys below 25 are  considered wives bearing children in their calves.

Film 
The concept of male pregnancy has been the subject of popular films, generally as a comedic device.

The 1978 comedy film Rabbit Test stars Billy Crystal as a young man who inexplicably becomes pregnant instead of his female sex partner.

In Monty Python's 1979 film, Life of Brian, there is a political satire scene in which a character demands that any man has a "right to have babies if he wants them," which is ridiculed as impossible.

The 1990 BBC television comedy drama Frankenstein's Baby features a Dr. Eva Frankenstein helping a male patient to become the “world's first” pregnant man.

The 1994 science fiction comedy/drama Junior stars Arnold Schwarzenegger as a fertility researcher who experiments on himself; the screenplay was inspired by a 1985 article in Omni magazine. 

The 2015 romantic comedy Paternity Leave explores the concept of a gay couple surprised with a miraculous pregnancy in feature length.

The 2017 film Mamaboy stars Sean O'Donnell as a teenager who decides to undergo an experimental procedure that enables him to carry his girlfriend's baby to term.

In 2019, as a social commentary on the issue of abortion, The Blacklist had an episode which had anti-abortion men being kidnapped and forced to be pregnant. One stayed consistent with their belief and gave birth while the other became hypocritical and sought to get an abortion despite it being illegal in their state. 

In April 2020, an independent film Three Pregnant Men was released on Gumroad in the form of a mock documentary following three of the eponymous pregnant men who have become part of an experimental project with a less than ethical corporation. When news of their pregnancy is leaked, each of them are put in jeopardy in different ways, allowing the film to explore gender norms, gay rights in Middle Eastern countries, racism/xenophobia, male privilege, and the power of corporations vs bodily autonomy.

Horror rarely dips into male pregnancy in depth. Minor appearances exist in the well-known Alien series, in which the first chestburster appears, as a result of the host organism using human bodies to gestate its young. While this concept is repeated and parodied widely, the origin is as much sci-fi as it is horror. In the 2019 anthology film The Mortuary Collection, a predatory fraternity brother named Jake has sex with a woman, using stealthing to trick her into having sex with him without a condom. As a result, her young grows in him rapidly over the course of a day, resulting in his bloody death when the child emerges. In 2020, the horror film Amulet depicts a soldier returning from war to live in a claustrophobic house with a woman and her mother, and a dark presence that may be lurking there as well. Like the former movie, male pregnancy serves as a sort of punishment for a man's sins.

Television 
The concept appears frequently as a comedic gag in numerous television programs as well. 

In a 1981 episode of the Canadian sketch comedy series Bizarre, the show’s resident daredevil character Super Dave Osborne (Bob Einstein) performs, as one of his many stunts, carrying and giving birth to a baby.

In the BBC science fiction comedy series Red Dwarf, the main character Dave Lister becomes pregnant after having sex with a female version of himself in an alternate universe.

In an episode of Sliders, the quartet "slides" into an alternate world in which babies develop during their final months in the father because a worldwide disease has kept women from being able to carry children beyond their first trimester.

In the popular fantasy series Charmeds fifth season, during a dream spell gone wrong, Leo ends up pregnant with Piper's baby for a good deal of the episode, leading to her referring to him as an "incubator" and at times berating him for "upsetting the baby".

A Season 6 episode of the popular situation comedy The Cosby Show features main protagonist Cliff Huxtable having a dream about a bizarre event causing thousands of men – including himself, Elvin, Martin and Theo – to become impregnated and – in the end – deliver some "unique" babies.

In the Ozzy & Drix episode "Ozzy Jr.", Ozzy thinks he is having a baby but is actually a parasite growing in his belly caused by an infection by Strepfinger.

In the Ren & Stimpy "Adult Party Cartoon" episode "Stimpy's Pregnant", Stimpy is thought to be pregnant but Mr. Horse finds out that he is actually constipated.

The possibility of extraterrestrial life having different reproductive sexuality is the basis for many references. In the Star Trek: Enterprise episode "Unexpected", Trip Tucker becomes pregnant with the offspring of a female of another species. In the video game The Sims 2 male characters can be impregnated via cheat codes or alien abduction. In the American Dad! episode "Deacon Stan, Jesus Man", the boy Steve becomes impregnated after giving the mouth-to-mouth resuscitation to the extraterrestrial Roger, then unwittingly passes it on to his girlfriend via a kiss. In the animated series Futurama, the extraterrestrial Kif can be impregnated by a touch. In Doctor Who (series 11), an episode features an alien man going into labor. In the SciFi Channel miniseries, Farscape: The Peacekeeper Wars, the extraterrestrial Rygel becomes impregnated with human John and Aeryn's baby. In the series Alien Nation, when Tectonese main character George Francisco and his wife Susan decide to have a third child, it is revealed that, in order to conceive, a Tectonese couple needs a third party, called a binnaum, to complete impregnation, and that the male carries the baby—encased in a pod—during the final months of gestation. In the animated series The Fairly OddParents in the TV film Fairly OddBaby, the fairy Cosmo was pregnant with Baby Poof. Additionally, Robert Sheckley's  1989 short story Love Song From the Stars also contains this element.  My Friends from Afar, a science fiction Singaporean drama series, Xiang Lin becomes pregnant to his surprise by kissing Tianning and his pregnancy provides an ongoing plotline in the latter half of the series. However, after he gives birth, it turns out that his species gives birth to eggs, which hatch, after some time, a child that appears to be roughly four years old.

In the Ben 10: Alien Force episode "Save the Last Dance", it is revealed that Necrofriggians have an ability to asexually reproduce once every 80 years, building a large nest made of digested metal where their eggs will hatch and their offspring will feed on the metal, first eating from the nest before they instinctively feed on solar plasma until they mature and starts their own separate lives. Due to the Necrofriggian reproduction cycle, Big Chill overtook Ben's personality to carry out the process, but Ben did not remember anything he did as Big Chill during this cycle, like eating metal and having 14 babies, and he felt very embarrassed when Gwen, Kevin and Julie explained, and Kevin's teasing and calling him "mommy" did not help. In The Three Stooges episode "Even as IOU" Curly accidentally swallows a Vitamin Z pill meant for a horse. However, the error allows Curly to give birth to an Equidae, which the Stooges crown as a winning race horse. The manga series Kentaro Hiyama's First Pregnancy takes place in the future where men are suddenly capable of becoming pregnant, though it is only a 10% chance of happening. The series explores the workplace prejudice that men and women experience and the titular character's efforts to change public opinion once he himself becomes pregnant.

Other 
Virgil Wong, a performance artist, created a hoax site featuring a fictitious male pregnancy, claiming to detail the pregnancy of his friend Lee Mingwei.

Male pregnancy is also commonly explored in hentai, the subgenre of speculative erotic fiction known as the Omegaverse, and slash (homosexual) fan fiction, usually based upon fantasy series such as Supernatural or Harry Potter.

See also

 Allotransplantation, transplanting of non-native tissue
 Artificial uterus (extracorporeal gestation)
 Couvade, a ritual
 Couvade syndrome, a sympathetic condition
 Female sperm
 Male egg
 Male lactation
 Male menstruation
 Simulated pregnancy
 Thomas Beatie
 Transgender pregnancy

References

Andrology
Human pregnancy